The Edwin S. Diuguid House, at 601 W. Main St. in Murray, Kentucky, was listed on the National Register of Historic Places in 1976.  It has also been known as the Diuguid-Kirk House.

The house "was built in 1895 by Edwin S. Diuguid, Sr. A native of Calloway County he was a successful and respected merchant of Murray, Kentucky. The house, the first residence built with pressed brick and trimmed with stone in Murray, was one of the largest and most pretentious houses in the area before the turn of the century."

It was designed by architect Alda Lafayette Lassiter of Paducah, Kentucky.

References

National Register of Historic Places in Calloway County, Kentucky
Queen Anne architecture in Kentucky
Romanesque Revival architecture in Kentucky
Colonial Revival architecture in Kentucky
Houses completed in 1895
Houses on the National Register of Historic Places in Kentucky
1895 establishments in Kentucky
Murray, Kentucky